"The End of Something" is a song by Rollins Band. It is the second single released in support of their fifth album Come In and Burn.

Formats and track listing 
All songs written by Sim Cain, Melvin Gibbs, Chris Haskett and Henry Rollins
US 7" single (22271)
"The End of Something" (LP Version) – 4:50
"Also Ran" – 3:12

US CD single (22271)
"The End of Something" (LP Version) – 4:50
"The End of Something" (We Change Fear Remix) – 4:34
"Threshold" (Previously Unreleased in the UK) – 9:10

UK CD single (22271)
"The End of Something" (LP Version) – 4:50
"The End of Something" (We Change Fear Remix) – 4:50
"Stray" – 3:40

Australian CD single (22258)
"The End of Something" (LP Version) – 4:50
"Also Ran" – 3:12
"The End of Something" (Remix) – 4:52

Charts

Release history

References

External links 
 

Rollins Band songs
1997 singles
1997 songs
Imago Records singles